Žegar is a settlement in the Municipality of Šentjur, eastern Slovenia. It lies just off the regional road leading southeast of the town of Šentjur, towards Kozje. The settlement, and the entire municipality, are included in the Savinja Statistical Region, which is in the Slovenian portion of the historical Duchy of Styria.

References

External links
Žegar at Geopedia

Populated places in the Municipality of Šentjur